The 2022 Massachusetts Secretary of the Commonwealth election was held on November 8, 2022, to elect the Massachusetts Secretary of the Commonwealth.  Incumbent Democrat William Galvin won re-election. Galvin has been Secretary since 1995. The last Republican to be elected to the position was Frederic Cook in 1949. Only Cook has served a longer tenure as Secretary.

Democratic primary

Candidates

Nominee
William Galvin, incumbent secretary of the commonwealth

Eliminated in primary
Tanisha Sullivan, corporate attorney and president of NAACP Boston

Endorsements

Polling

Results

Convention

Primary

Republican primary

Candidates

Nominee

Results

General election

Predictions

Polling

Results

Notes

Partisan clients

References

External links
Official campaign websites
Rayla Campbell (R) for Secretary of the Commonwealth
Bill Galvin (D) for Secretary of the Commonwealth

Secretary of State
Massachusetts
Massachusetts Secretary of State elections